David Dodge Boyden (Westport, Connecticut, December 10, 1910Berkeley, California – September 18, 1986) was an American musicologist and violinist specializing in organology and performance practice.

Education
Boyden received a BA (1932) and MA (1938) from Harvard University; he also studied at Columbia University and Hartt School of Music (the latter awarding him an honorary Ph.D. in 1957).

Career
After teaching for a year at Mills College, Boyden joined the faculty at the University of California, Berkeley in 1939; he taught at UC Berkeley until 1975 as assistant professor (1943-9), associate professor (1949–55), full professor (1955-75), and also served as chairman of the music department (1955–61). Boyden played an important role in the development of the UC Berkeley music department in his position as chair. He was instrumental not only in building up the musicology department, but also in promoting the ethnomusicology, composition, and performance sectors.

Boyden was twice president of the American Musicological Society (1954–56, 1960–62), and a member of the executive board in 1958, 1966, and 1978-79. He was also involved with the International Musicological Society, the Royal Musical Association (England), the Galpin Society (London), and the Stradivari Society. After a long struggle with Parkinson’s disease, Boyden died on September 18, 1986.

Awards
Boyden was awarded a Fulbright to teach at Oxford University (1963), and thrice received a Guggenheim fellowship (1954, 1967, 1970). The University of California, Berkeley honored him with the Berkeley Citation in 1980.

Publications
Boyden published in many journals, including The Musical Quarterly, The Journal of the American Musicological Society, and The Strad. Boyden published three textbooks, including the widely read An Introduction to Music. Boyden's focal scholarly research, however, was his innovative work on string instruments and performance practice; this culminated in the publication A History of Violin Playing from its Origins to 1761. This book, first published in 1965, and later translated into German and Polish, was a seminal work in both organology and performance studies. It has been influential not only for scholars, but also for generations of string players.

A History of Violin Playing from its Origins to 1761
This work follows a chronology divided into four parts: “I. The Formative Period, 1520-1600”; “II. The Development of an Idiomatic Technique, 1600-1650”; “III. National School of the Late Seventeenth Century. The Rise of Virtuosity”; and “IV. The Culmination of the Early History of Violin Playing, 1700-1761.” In each of these sections Boyden utilizes musical analyses of relevant works, organological studies, and iconographical studies, as well as critical examinations of treatises and contemporary accounts to elucidate the development of the violin, its performance and technique. Boyden also adeptly infuses personal insight from his broad experience and knowledge as a scholar of musical objects and performance. Boyden started a sequel to A History of Violin Playing from its Origins to 1761, but it was never completed.

References

1910 births
1986 deaths
American male violinists
University of Hartford Hartt School alumni
Harvard University alumni
Columbia University alumni
University of California, Berkeley College of Letters and Science faculty
20th-century American violinists
20th-century American musicologists
20th-century American male musicians